{{DISPLAYTITLE:C24H24N2O4}}
The molecular formula C24H24N2O4 (molar mass: 404.45 g/mol, exact mass: 404.1736 u) may refer to:

 Abecarnil (ZK-112,119)
 Nicocodeine

Molecular formulas